The Ayuwang or Ashoka Pagoda is a stupa in Dai County in northeast Xinzhou Prefecture in northern Shanxi, China.

Name
The Ayuwang Pagoda's name honors Ashoka, the Mauryan emperor who converted to Buddhism around 263BC and subsequently greatly patronized the religion.

History
The Ayuwang Pagoda was first built under the Sui dynasty in AD601. Over the next 600 years, it was destroyed and rebuilt three times. Its present form dates to the Mongol-led Yuan dynasty of China, who favored Tibetan Buddhism and rebuilt the tower in a Tibetan style. This dagoba was heavily damaged by an earthquake during the Qing dynasty and subsequently repaired.

References

Citations

Bibliography
 .

Buddhist temples in Shanxi
Pagodas in China
Major National Historical and Cultural Sites in Shanxi
Yuan dynasty architecture